Tudur ap Goronwy (c. 1310 - c. 1367) was a Welsh landowner, soldier and administrator of the Tudors of Penmynydd family from the island of Anglesey.

Origins
Born about 1310, he was one of the two sons of Goronwy ap Tudur Hen and his wife Gwerfyl ferch Madog. His father had fought for King Edward I of England and had stayed loyal to King Edward II of England. On his father's death in 1331, he inherited the family lands which had passed down from his grandfather Tudur Hen and lived in the village of Trecastell.

His brother and ally, Hywel ap Goronwy (died about 1366), joined the priesthood, becoming a canon of Bangor Cathedral, and eventually Archdeacon of Anglesey.

Career
He was a royal officer for the island of Anglesey, and served in the English army of King Edward III of England during the campaigns in France in 1337.

In 1345 he and his brother Hywel were involved in a prominent murder case, probably the result of local unrest. Henry Shalford, newly appointed as the Prince of Wales' representative in North Wales, was attacked and killed near Hywel's house in Bangor by a band of men led by Tudur. 
One report suggested that Shalford knew too much about malpractice among leading Welshmen. 
The result was panic among the English inhabitants of the area and suspicion of the Welsh community. Both brothers were arrested and placed in custody, with Hywel held at Launceston in Cornwall and Tudur in Chester, but both were eventually released without charge or penalty. This led to complaints by English residents that "no Welsh man dare indict them" because of their local influence. Gruffydd ap Maredudd ap Dafydd suggested that the brothers were as strong as oak trees and protected all those under their branches. In 1352, both were in peaceful possession of their ancestral lands in Anglesey.

Tudur was buried in the south wall of the chancel at the Franciscan friary of Llanfaes near Bangor, Gwynedd. The bodies of his ancestors were nearby, in the south wall of the chapel. The bard Iolo Goch composed an elegy to him.

Family
The Welsh genealogies show Tudur ap Goronwy marrying twice, to Mallt ferch Madog, daughter of Madog ap Iorwerth, and to Marged ferch Tomos, daughter of Tomos ap Llewelyn and aunt of rebel Owain Glyndŵr,  and having six sons:

Goronwy ap Tudur 
Rhys ap Tudur (by Mallt)
Ednyfed ap Tudur 
Gwilym ap Tudur 
Rhys ap Tudur (by Marged)
Maredudd ap Tudur

All rose to positions of power locally on Anglesey and in the adjoining areas of North Wales. Both Rhys and Gwilym accompanied King Richard II of England on his expedition to Ireland in 1398 and, after he was deposed, Rhys, Gwilym and Maredudd were supporters of the Welsh uprising of their cousin Owain Glyndŵr against King Henry IV of England.

Maredudd's son Owain, known in English as Owen Tudor, became the grandfather of King Henry VII of England.

Lineage

References

References

1310s births
1367 deaths
14th-century Welsh people
Welsh soldiers
Welsh landowners
People from Anglesey
Tudur